Mother Earth's Plantasia (subtitled "warm earth music for plants and the people who love them"), commonly referred to as simply Plantasia, is an electronic album by Mort Garson first released in 1976.

Background
The music on it was composed specifically for plants to listen to. Garson used a Moog synthesizer to compose the album.

Legacy
The album had a very limited distribution upon release, only being available to people who bought a houseplant from a store called Mother Earth on Melrose Avenue in Los Angeles or those who purchased a Simmons mattress from a Sears outlet, both of which came with the record. As a result, the album failed to attain widespread popularity around the time of its release. However, it has since gained a cult following as an early work of electronic music.

In March 2019, Sacred Bones Records announced that they were officially reissuing the album. The reissue is available on music streaming services and was released on Vinyl, CD and Cassette as well on June 21, 2019. Angie Martoccio, writing for Rolling Stone in 2019, described Mother Earth's Plantasia as Garson's magnum opus. Stephen M. Deusner, writing for Pitchfork, described it as perhaps Garson's "most beloved album, at least among crate-diggers and record collectors."

For the 2023 tax season, Intuit used the opening track "Plantasia" on a TurboTax advertisement.

Track listing

Personnel 
Mort Garson score, electronics
Eugene L. Hamblin III electronic engineering
Sam Nicholson art direction
Marvin Rubin illustrations

Charts

See also 
 Stevie Wonder's Journey Through "The Secret Life of Plants", 1979 album by Stevie Wonder
 Plant perception (physiology)

References 

Mort Garson albums
1976 albums
Plants in culture
Albums with cover art by Robert Beatty (artist)